Salpingophora is a genus of beetles in the family Cicindelidae, containing the following species:

 Salpingophora bellana (W. Horn, 1905)
 Salpingophora hanseatica (W. Horn, 1927)
 Salpingophora helferi (Schaum, 1863)
 Salpingophora maindroni (W. Horn, 1897)
 Salpingophora rueppelii (Guerin-Meneville, 1847)

References

Cicindelidae